Alexandre Louis Philippe Marie Berthier, 4th Prince de Wagram (20 July 1883 – 30 May 1918) was a French nobleman and an art collector.

Early life 
Born as the son of Alexandre Berthier, 3rd Prince of Wagram (1836–1911) and Baroness Bertha Clara von Rothschild (1862–1903), member of the German branch of the prominent Rothschild family. The family resided in the ancestral home, the Château de Grosbois, a large estate in Boissy-Saint-Léger, southeast of Paris. He had two sisters, Elisabeth (1885–1960) and Marguerite (1887–1966) of whom the latter married Prince Jean Victor de Broglie.

Biography 
Alexandre Berthier was an active collector of modern art. He owned works by Alfred Sisley, Camille Pissarro, Claude Monet and Pierre-Auguste Renoir. Of the last he bequeathed 17 to the French nation in his will.

Berthier bequeathed Grosbois to his sister before leaving for the Army and World War I on 1 August 1914. An army captain and the leader of a company of chasseurs during the Third Battle of the Aisne, he sustained wounds from shell fire at Fort de Condé-sur-Aisne and died from them on 30 May 1918. He had no issue. He was buried at the Château de Grosbois like his father and grandfather.

Ancestry

References 
 Max Reyne: Les 26 Maréchaux de Napoléon: Soldats de la Révolution, gloires de l'Empire, 1990

Footnotes

Princes of Wagram
Wagram
Alexandre
French Jews
French people of German-Jewish descent
Wagram
Wagram
Wagram